Pleuroceridae, common name pleurocerids, is a family of small to medium-sized freshwater snails, aquatic gilled gastropod mollusks in the superfamily Cerithioidea.These snails have an operculum and typically a robust high-spired shell.

Reproduction is iteroparous, and juvenile snails emerge from eggs laid on a firm surface by a gonochoristic female.  There is no veliger stage.

Distribution
As currently defined, this family is confined entirely to eastern North American fresh waters. Similar snails formerly classified with Pleuroceridae, but now assigned to other families are widespread in temperate and tropical parts of Southern and Eastern Asia, and Africa. Most require unpolluted rivers and streams, but a few are adapted to living in lakes or reservoirs.

Taxonomy

2005 taxonomy 
The following two subfamilies have been recognized in the taxonomy of Bouchet & Rocroi (2005):
 Pleurocerinae P. Fischer, 1885 - synonyms: Ceriphasiinae Gill, 1863; Strepomatidae Haldeman, 1864; Ellipstomatidae Hannibal, 1912; Gyrotominae Hannibal, 1912; Anaplocamidae Dall, 1921
 Semisulcospirinae Morrison, 1952 - synonym: Jugidae Starobogatov, Prozorova, Bogatov & Sayenko, 2004 (n.a.)

2009 taxonomy 
Subfamily Semisulcospirinae within Pleuroceridae was elevated to family level Semisulcospiridae by Strong & Köhler (2009).

Genera 
There is very high level of mitochondrial heterogeneity in apparent species of Pleuroceridae (highest among gastropods, also with Semisulcospiridae), that has not been sufficiently explained yet as of 2015.

Genera within the family Pleuroceridae are organized in the one subfamily only since 2009 and they include:

Pleurocerinae
 Pleurocera Rafinesque, 1818 - type genus of the family Pleuroceridae, 
 Elimia H. Adams & A. Adams, 1854 synonyms:Goniobasis Lea, 1862
 Athearnia Morrison, 1971
 † Gyrotoma Shuttleworth, 1845
 Io Lea, 1831 - with the only species Io fluvialis (Say, 1825)
 Leptoxis Rafinesque, 1819
 Lithasia Haldeman, 1840

References

Further reading 
 Tryon G. W. (1865). "Observations on the family Strepomatidae". American Journal of Conchology 1(2): 97-135.
  Tryon G. W. (1865). Synonymy of the species of Strepomatidae (melanians) of the United States; with critical observations on their affinities, and descriptions of land, fresh water and marine Mollusca. New York, Ballière Brothers, 520 Broadway, 100 pp., 2 plates.
 Graf, D. L. (2001). The cleansing of the Augean Stables, or a lexicon of the nominal species of the Pleuroceridae (Gastropoda: Prosobranchia) of recent North America, North Mexico. Walkerana. 12(27): 1-124

External links